Carlisle Wallace Higgins (1889–1980) was a North Carolina attorney and jurist. He was a native of Alleghany County, North Carolina.

Higgins served in both houses of the North Carolina General Assembly before being appointed U.S. Attorney for the Middle District of North Carolina by President Franklin D. Roosevelt (1934–1947). In 1946 he became a prosecutor for the war crimes trials in Japan. Higgins later served as an associate justice of the North Carolina Supreme Court (1954–1974). He is among the longest-serving justices in the history of the North Carolina Supreme Court. Upon his retirement from the Court, he joined the law firm of Tharrington Smith, co-founded by his former law clerk, Wade Smith. He remained with the Raleigh-based firm until his death in 1980.

References

1889 births
1980 deaths
Members of the North Carolina House of Representatives
North Carolina state senators
North Carolina lawyers
United States Attorneys for the Middle District of North Carolina
Justices of the North Carolina Supreme Court
20th-century American judges
20th-century American politicians
20th-century American lawyers